The Nigerian National Assembly delegation from Jigawa State comprises three Senators and eleven Representatives.

6th Assembly (2007–2011)

The 6th National Assembly (2007–2011) was inaugurated on 5 June 2007.
The People's Democratic Party (PDP) won all the Senate and House seats.

Senators representing Jigawa State in the 6th Assembly were:

Representatives in the 6th Assembly were:

8th Assembly

9th Assembly

See also
7th assembly Senate of Nigeria
Nigerian National Assembly

References

Jigawa State
National Assembly (Nigeria) delegations by state